Currumbin Primary School (or Currumbin State School) is a public school for students from prep up to grade 6 located in the Gold Coast suburb of Currumbin, Queensland. It was founded in 1909 and now has over 1200 students.  This school is located near Palm Beach Currumbin State High with many students graduating to it.

Facilities 

The school contains:

 Handball, basketball and netball courts;
 Multiple adventure playgrounds for students of various ages;
 Multiple large ovals and grassed areas for students;
 Numerous vegetable gardens;
 A specialised prep precinct catering towards  prep students;
 International standard indoor basketball stadium;
 25 metre heated swimming pool;
 Assembly Hall;
 Music rooms;
 Media centre
 Computer laboratories.

References

Public primary schools in Queensland
Currumbin, Queensland
Educational institutions established in 1909
1909 establishments in Australia